Flag of New York may refer to:

 Flag of the State of New York
 Flags of New York City